When Pigs Fly: Songs You Never Thought You'd Hear is a compilation album devised and produced by musician Cevin Soling in 2002. The album is a collection of popular songs recorded by artists considered unlikely to cover them.

Overview 
After Soling's earlier success recruiting Kevin DuBrow to sing a mellow version of Quiet Riot's "Metal Health" with Soling's band The Neanderthal Spongecake, he came up with the idea for the project and began recruiting musicians to participate.

The album includes a version of Nat King Cole's "Unforgettable", performed by Ani DiFranco and Jackie Chan, which Soling co-produced with DiFranco; Blondie's "Call Me", as performed by The Box Tops with Alex Chilton; and Peter Gabriel's "Shock the Monkey", sung by Don Ho, which Soling also produced and arranged.

The choice of Devo to record "Ohio" is rather poignant. The protest song deals with the 1970 Kent State Shootings, and band member Gerald Casale was both a student at the university at the time, and an eyewitness to the shootings.

Track listing

Personnel
 Cevin Soling - Producer

References

External links
Album at Amazon.com

2002 compilation albums
Xemu Records albums